Set the Controls for the Heart of the Bass is the debut album by British house music band Bassomatic. The album was released in 1990.

Background 
The title and title track are derived from the Pink Floyd song "Set the Controls for the Heart of the Sun".

Track listing

Personnel
Dave Chelsea - engineer
Richard Dight - engineer
Rik Kenton - clavinet, guitar
Laurie Mayer - vocals
MC A-side - rap
MC Midrange - drums
McInna One Step - voices
Sharon Musgrave - vocals
William Orbit - multi instruments
Steve Roberts - vocal harmony
Dean Ross - piano
Sugar J. - turntables
Lizzie Tear - voices
Matthew Vaughan - guitar, organ, Hammond organ, piano, strings

References

1990 debut albums
Albums produced by William Orbit
Virgin Records albums